Hannington railway station is a former railway station near Hannington, in Wiltshire, England on the Highworth Branch Line from .

The station was about a mile southeast of Hannington village, near the Blunsdon to Highworth road; the platform had a small wooden building and there was a small goods yard. Much of the traffic was agricultural, milk in particular.

The line operated a passenger service from 9 May 1883 until 2 March 1953, and the branch closed to all traffic in 1962.

Although the majority of the station has disappeared the front of the platform is still visible.

References

 

Disused railway stations in Wiltshire
Former Great Western Railway stations
Railway stations in Great Britain opened in 1883
Railway stations in Great Britain closed in 1953